Battle of Yeonpyeong may refer to:

First Battle of Yeonpyeong (1999; ; aka First Battle of Western Sea), Northern Limit Line naval sea battle between North and South Korea
Second Battle of Yeonpyeong (2002; ; aka Second Battle of Western Sea), Northern Limit Line naval battle between North and South Korea
Bombardment of Yeonpyeong (2010) Northern Limit Line artillery duel between North and South Korea
Battle of Yeonpyeong (film), a 2015 South Korean film based on the 2002 battle

See also
 List of Korean battles
 Yeonpyeong
 Northern Limit Line
 Western Sea (disambiguation)